Ocean's Kingdom is a ballet choreographed by Peter Martins for the New York City Ballet to eponymous music and libretto by Paul McCartney. The work's premiere took place on 22 September 2011 at the Fall Gala in the David H. Koch Theater, Lincoln Center.

Synopsis

Movement I: Ocean's Kingdom
The Princess Honorata lives with her father, King Ocean, in an underwater kingdom. In charge of her handmaidens is the somewhat sinister character Scala. Their idyllic existence is one day interrupted by intruders from the earthly kingdom, ruled by King Terra. He arrives with his band of aggressive followers and his younger brother Prince Stone. They are there to deliver an invitation to a grand ball. Prince Stone begins to fall in love with Princess Honorata.

Movement II: Hall of Dance
Guests arrive at the grand Hall of Dance and are treated to a spectacle of acrobatic dancing.  Wandering through their midst are three drunken lords. King Ocean and Honorata arrive and, once again, encounter King Terra's unruly retinue. The attraction between Stone and Honorarta becomes stronger as the rivalry between the dancers becomes more intense. At the end of the dance, unnoticed by Prince Stone and King Ocean, Honorata is kidnapped by King Terra, who secretly desires her himself, and his henchmen by the aid of the treacherous Scala.

Movement III: Imprisonment
Princess Honorata despairs of her fate as she is seen imprisoned in Terra's run-down palace. Prince Stone arrives, furious at Terra's actions and Scala's betrayal. He demands Honorata's release but is rebuffed by Terra. Scala realizes she was wrong to turn against her mistress and promises to aid Prince Stone with Honorata's release. The two lovers are reunited and fall into a passionate embrace before escaping.

Movement IV: Moonrise
As the moon rises outside Terra's palace, Scala, Honorata and Stone escape into the night. They are soon pursued by Terra and his warriors. Against the wishes of the lovers, Scala turns back to stop the advancing army, and though she is ignored by them she magically conjures up a storm which envelopes and destroys them. To the horror of Honorata and Stone, Scala also perishes. They escape and are met by friendly forces from the Ocean Kingdom. They return home in triumph and as the celebrations subside and the lovers are left alone, the spirit of Scala makes a final appearance to bless their union.

Cast

Original

Footnotes 

Ballets by Peter Martins
Ballets to the music of Paul McCartney
2011 ballet premieres
New York City Ballet repertory